California Magazine is a general-interest magazine and website that covers the news, issues, discoveries, and people of the University of California, Berkeley. It was founded in 1897 and is published by the Cal Alumni Association, a non-profit organization. The print edition is published four times annually. Wendy Miller, formerly of the Los Angeles Times and the San Francisco Chronicle, is the editor-in-chief. California Magazine contributors have included Michael Pollan, Pat Joseph, Seth Rosenfeld, Jon Carroll, Sophie Brickman, Yousur Alhlou, Chris A. Smith, and Sandy Tolan.

History 
The magazine has varied in name and frequency, appearing monthly, bi-monthly (-2009) and latterly quarterly (2009-), and was for a large part of its history known as California Monthly.

References

External links

Alumni magazines
Bimonthly magazines published in the United States
Local interest magazines published in the United States
Monthly magazines published in the United States
Quarterly magazines published in the United States
Magazines established in 1897
Magazines published in the San Francisco Bay Area